About the Little Red Riding Hood is a 1977 Soviet two-part musical TV movie based on the ideas of Charles Perrault and directed by Leonid Nechayev. The story is a sequel of the tale of Little Red Riding Hood.

The film is a deconstruction of the classic fairy tale. The manner in which the characters of the wolves is portrayed is different from the original story, as the wolves are viewed as human beings throughout the film. They are akin to a family of forest hermits or a clan of bandits.

Plot 
The story takes place one year after the well-known story of Little Red Riding Hood. The wolf, who had been killed by the woodcutter, is revealed to have left behind family and friends who now wish to get revenge on Little Red. The deceased wolf's mother pays his friend, Lean Wolf to take her other son, Fat wolf and together catch Little Red Riding Hood.

The wolves find a way to make Little Red Riding Hood believe that her grandmother has fallen ill again. Unaware that her grandmother is not truly ill, Little Red Riding Hood sets out through the forest to go visit her, meeting the wolves and other people on her journey. The little girl manages to foil all of the plans thought of by the wolves to catch her. They try dressing in clothes that will deceive Little Red Riding Hood into believing that they are kind and friendly, but in the end, she sucks them into her own game and they continually fail to catch her.

Wolf cub, the deceased wolf's son, who spends his time reading stories, is clearly opposed to taking revenge on anyone for the things that have happened and prefers to have nothing to do with his vengeful wolf family. His grandmother, angry with his lack of support, burns his storybook, which sends the cub into tears, and he runs away from his grandmother.

On her travels, Little Red Riding Hood meets with ever more obstacles, such as a young, spoiled boy who wishes to take Little Red Riding Hood as his possession so he can play with her whenever he wishes. He locks her in a room, but she is saved by Lean Wolf and Fat Wolf, who are now dressed as stately women, but are waiting with a sack to snatch her up. Wolf Cub takes the sack and foils their plans.

The cub tries to hint at Little Red Riding Hood that her grandmother is not truly ill, but she does not heed his advice and continues on her way, and again the two wolves attempt to catch her. However, Fat Wolf, has grown attached to Little Red Riding Hood and is no longer so keen on capturing her as he had been initially.

Little Red later learns from a shepherd who had previously conspired with the wolves, that her newfound companions are indeed the wolves. Upset and frustrated by this news, she dresses as the shepherd and gets the Lean Wolf to confirm his identity. She also brought the wolves a sleeping pill made of poppies instead of water, and they were put to sleep.

Little Red Riding Hood proceeds to run away and runs into a hunter who only speaks of himself as if he were great, when in reality he is a coward. He wishes to shoot the wolves while they are asleep, but the girl stops him because she wishes to take the wolves to her village to be judged and so they can repent.

The people from the village now learn of the trouble and come to Little Red Riding Hood's aid. They intend to hurt the wolves, but Little Red does not wish them any harm. She allows the wolves to flee.

Awards 
The actress playing the main role of Little Red Riding Hood was a laureate of the USSR State Prize in literature and arts in 1978 for her acting in this film.

Cast 
Yana Poplavskaya as Little Red Riding Hood
Evgeni Evstigneev as Star Counter
Dmitri Iosifov as Wolf Cub
Rina Zelyonaya as Grandma
Vladimir Basov as Loan Wolf
Nikolay Trofimov as Small Fat Wolf
Galina Volchek as Mother Wolf 
Rolan Bykov as Hunter
Stefaniya Stanyuta as 1st evil old woman
Mariya Barabanova as 2nd evil old woman
Maria Vinogradova as 3rd evil old woman
Yuri Belov as Grandad
Aleksandra Dorokhina as Lady
Georgi Georgiu as Gentleman
Inna Stepanova as Kid

References

External links

1970s musical fantasy films
Soviet musical fantasy films
Soviet children's fantasy films
Russian children's fantasy films
Russian musical fantasy films
Soviet television films
Belarusfilm films
Belarusian musical films
Soviet-era Belarusian films
Films directed by Leonid Nechayev
Films based on Little Red Riding Hood